Sumter County is a county located in the central portion of the U.S. state of Florida. As of the 2020 census, the population is 129,752. It has the oldest median age (68.3 years) of any US county and the highest percentage of residents aged 65 and older—at 55.6% in 2014-2018 (in 2009–2013). Its county seat is Bushnell, and the largest community is The Villages.

Sumter County coincides with The Villages, FL Metropolitan Statistical Area, which is included in the Orlando-Lakeland-Deltona, FL Combined Statistical Area.

History
Sumter County was created in 1853.  It was named for General Thomas Sumter, a general in the American Revolutionary War. The county in the past, and to this day by some, is nicknamed "Hog County" most likely because it is home to a large population of wild hogs. Hog hunting is still a favorite pastime of locals in the more rural portions of the county.

Although long extremely rural, in recent years Sumter County has sustained an exceptionally large increase in population, almost solely due to the expansion of The Villages retirement complex, a significant portion of which is in the county. This has dramatically changed the demographics of the county and has brought in significant income.

Sumter County was affected by the massive Florida tornado outbreak of February 2, 2007, and a state of emergency was declared.

Geography

Adjacent counties
 Marion County - north
 Lake County - east
 Polk County - southeast
 Pasco County - southwest
 Hernando County - west
 Citrus County - northwest

Demographics

As of the 2020 United States census, there were 129,752 people, 59,076 households, and 39,605 families residing in the county.

As of the census of 2000, there were 53,345 people, 20,779 households, and 15,043 families residing in the county. There were 25,195 housing units at an average density of 46 per square mile (18/km2). The racial makeup of the county was 82.60% White, 13.78% Black or African American, 0.51% Native American, 0.41% Asian, 0.05% Pacific Islander, 1.16% from other races, and 1.49% from two or more races. 6.29% of the population were Hispanic or Latino of any race.

There were 20,779 households, out of which 18.80% had children under the age of 18 living with them, 60.90% were married couples living together, 8.40% had a female householder with no husband present, and 27.60% were non-families. 23.50% of all households were made up of individuals, and 13.80% had someone living alone who was 65 years of age or older. The average household size was 2.27 and the average family size was 2.62. According to U. S. News & World Report over half the population of Sumter County are now senior citizens.

In the county, the population was spread out, with 16.10% under the age of 18, 5.90% from 18 to 24, 23.30% from 25 to 44, 27.30% from 45 to 64, and 27.40% who were 65 years of age or older. The median age was 49 years. For every 100 females, there were 113.10 males. For every 100 females age 18 and over, there were 113.90 males.

The median income for a household in the county was $32,073, and the median income for a family was $36,999. Males had a median income of $27,346 versus $21,145 for females. The per capita income for the county was $16,830. About 9.60% of families and 13.70% of the population were below the poverty line, including 26.00% of those under age 18 and 7.70% of those age 65 or over. According to The Daily Commercial, Sumter County's unemployment rate as of March 2009 is 13.2 percent.

Law enforcement

The Sumter County Sheriff's Office is accredited by the Commission for Florida Law Enforcement Accreditation, Inc. and recognized by the Commission on Accreditation for Law Enforcement Agencies. It primarily patrols the unincorporated areas of Sumter County.

Federal Correctional Complex, Coleman of the Federal Bureau of Prisons (BOP) is located in the county.

It includes:
 Federal Correctional Institution, Coleman Low (FCI Coleman Low)
 Federal Correctional Institution, Coleman Medium (FCI Coleman Medium)
 United States Penitentiary I, Coleman (Coleman USP I)
 United States Penitentiary II, Coleman (Coleman USP II)

Politics

Most likely owing to its majority-elderly population, Sumter County has been a Republican stronghold in the 21st century.

Transportation

Railroads
CSX operates one rail line within the county. Amtrak formerly provided passenger rail service to Wildwood, but the stop was terminated in late 2004. Other lines have existed in the past, most notably one from Coleman southeast towards Auburndale in Polk County, part of which includes the General James A. Van Fleet State Trail in Mabel. Amtrak ran along this line until 1988. Another line ran from Croom in Hernando County to Center Hill. Today, part of it is a Forest Road in Withlacoochee State Forest north of the Sumter Rest Area on I-75. A fourth one was part of the Orange Belt Railway, which ran from Trilby in Pasco County to Sylvan Lake in Seminole County. This runs along the south side of State Road 50 east of Tarrytown.

Major roads

  Interstate 75 runs north and south across the western and northern part of the county, with interchanges at County Roads 476B & 673(Exit 309), SR 48 (Exit 314) CR 470(Exit 321), Florida's Turnpike(Exit 328), and SR 44(Exit 329).
  Florida's Turnpike runs north and south from Southeastern and Central Florida. Only two interchanges exist in the county; US 301(Exit 304) and at the northern terminus at I-75(unmarked Exit 309), in Wildwood. Plans are currently under way to reconstruct the interchange, by combining it with I-75 & SR 44.
  U.S. Route 301 is the main local road through Sumter County, running southwest to northeast.
  State Road 44 runs east and west through the northern part of the county from Rutland into Lake County.
  County Road 470: runs east and west from SR 44 near the Sumter-Citrus County Line along the west side of Lake Panasoffkee, then briefly joins US 301 in Sumterville before heading east again towards Lake County.
  County Road 48 runs mostly east and west through Central Sumter County. It spans from Floral City in Citrus County to Howey-in-the Hills in Lake County. Until December 2016 the segment in Bushnell between I-75 (Exit 314) and US 301 was designated as a state road. Between the western terminus and US 301, it is also shared by the DeSoto Trail.
  County Road 476: East-West Bi-County road running from Nobleton in Hernando County to Webster. The road spans as far west as US 19 along the Chassahowitzka National Wildlife Refuge.
  State Road 50 runs east and west across the southern part of the county from Withlacoochee State Forest in Hernando County through Tarrytown and Mabel before entering Lake County.
  State Road 471 runs north and south from Polk County north of US 98 into US 301 in Sumterville.
  County Road 475: Two north–south roads that were previously one until Interstate 75 was built. One section spans from SR 48 in Bushnell to CR 470 on the southeast corner of Exit 321 on I-75 in Lake Panasoffkee. The other starts at SR 44 in Wildwood west of Exit 329 on I-75 and crosses the Marion County line towards Ocala.
  County Road 466-A:
  County Road 466:
  County Road 462:
  County Road 476-B:

Scenic Sumter Heritage Byway
The Sumter County Chamber of Commerce, the cities of Webster and Bushnell, the Sumter County government, businesses, community leaders, veterans’ groups, and individuals worked to have 62 miles of road in Sumter County designated by the state of Florida as a Florida Scenic Byway.  On September 1, 2010, the Scenic Sumter Heritage Byway was designated a candidate for the Florida Scenic Highway Program.  The Scenic Sumter Heritage Byway became the 24th highway to be designated a Florida Scenic Highway by the Florida Department of Transportation in June 2013. Points of interest along the route include the Dade Battlefield State Historic Site, the Sumter County Farmer's Market, Lake Panasoffkee, the Florida National Cemetery. On January 25, 2014, community leaders, supporters of the byway, and Assistant Secretary of the Florida Department of Transportation Brian Blanchard cut the ribbon to the highway at the Dade Battlefield State Historic Site in Bushnell.

Public Transportation
Sumter County operates Sumter County Transit, which operates three fixed-route services, as well as paratransit service.

Education
Sumter District Schools operates district public and private schools in Sumter County.

The Villages Charter Schools is a K-12 charter school in unincorporated northern Sumter County in The Villages CDP. Children are eligible to attend the charter school if one or both of their parents work for The Villages.

Among  other schools  in  the county  is South Sumter Middle School, a junior high school for students in grades 6–8, and Lake-Sumter State College has a campus in Sumterville that serves the community.

Libraries
Sumter County has five branches serving its community as well as a Lake-Sumter State College campus library that is open to the public.
 Bushnell Public Library
 E.C. Rowell Public Library
 Panasoffkee Community Library
 Villages Public Library (Belvedere)
 Villages Public Library (Pinellas Plaza)
 Lake-Sumter State College Library (Sumterville)

The Sumter County Library Services began servicing the Wahoo, Center Hill, Linden, Croom-A-Coochee areas through the county's Library on Wheels program in 2008.

Communities

Cities
 Bushnell
 Center Hill
 Coleman
 Webster
 Wildwood

Census-designated places
 Lake Panasoffkee
 The Villages

Other unincorporated communities

 Croom-A-Coochee
 Linden
 Mabel
 Oak Grove
 Orange Home
 Oxford
 Royal
 Rutland
 St. Catherine
 Sumterville
 Tarrytown
 Wahoo

See also
 National Register of Historic Places listings in Sumter County, Florida

Notes

References

External links

Government links/Constitutional offices
 Sumter County Board of County Commissioners
 Sumter County Supervisor of Elections
 Sumter County Property Appraiser
 Sumter County Sheriff's Office
 Sumter County Tax Collector
Sumter County Clerk of Court

Special districts
 Sumter County School Board
 Southwest Florida Water Management District

Judicial branch
  Public Defender, 5th Judicial Circuit of Florida serving Citrus, Hernando, Lake, Marion, and Sumter counties
  Office of the State Attorney, 5th Judicial Circuit of Florida
  Circuit and County Court for the 5th Judicial Circuit of Florida

Museum and Library Resources
 Photographs From the State Library & Archives of Florida.
 The Sumter County Times, the local newspaper for Sumter County, Florida fully and openly available in the Florida Digital Newspaper Library

Business and Visitor Information
 Sumter County Chamber of Commerce

 
Florida counties
1853 establishments in Florida
Counties in Greater Orlando
Populated places established in 1853
Micropolitan areas of Florida